The UC Santa Cruz Banana Slugs are the athletic teams that represent the University of California, Santa Cruz. The Banana Slugs compete in Division III of the NCAA, mostly in the Coast to Coast Athletic Conference (C2C). There are fifteen varsity sports – men's and women's basketball, tennis, soccer, volleyball, swimming and diving, cross country, and women's golf. UCSC teams have been Division III nationally ranked in tennis, soccer, men's volleyball, and swimming. UCSC maintains a number of successful club sides.

UC Santa Cruz joined the NCAA in Fall 1980 after years of playing unofficial club competition. In 2016, due to a mounting debt in funding of the athletic program, the university polled its students on whether or not they would approve an increase in student fees which would be necessary to maintain the athletic program. There was a significant doubt that the students would approve this increase. Contrary to the predictions, a majority of the students approved a significant addition to their annual fees to maintain the existence of the athletic program.

Varsity sports 

UCSC participates in men's and women's basketball, cross country, golf, soccer, swimming & diving, tennis, track & field, and volleyball. In the past, it has also participated in water polo.

Basketball
Until 1972, there was a loosely structured club basketball team with no coach; they played the local junior colleges and bible colleges. A more formal team (with a student coach) was fielded in 1972–73. They finished 22–6. Since 2013, both men's and women's basketball teams play downtown at the Kaiser Permanente Arena.

Cross Country
The Women’s Cross Country team has finished as high as 5th at the NCAA West Regional Championships in 2014 with 7th place finishes in 2008, 2015, and 2016. The best finish by the Men’s  Cross Country team at Regionals was second in 2017, with 6th place finishes in 1985, 1989, and 2013 and 7th place finishes in 2014 and 2016.

Soccer
The Banana Slugs were national runners-up in men's soccer in 2004. Team members included future MLS players Adam Smarte and Stephen Wondolowski.

Tennis
By defeating Emory to win the 2007 NCAA Championship in men's tennis, UCSC won their sixth  Division III team championship. UCSC won their seventh championship in 2009 beating Amherst College in the finals to tie Kalamazoo for the most team titles in NCAA Division III.

Track & Field

UCSC added a woman's track & field varsity program in 2012. In 2016, it added a men's varsity program as well. In 2017, the Slugs track & field team competed in all event groups, for both men and women, for the first time.

Volleyball 
In 2012, the Men's Volleyball Team made a Division III NCAA Semifinal appearance in the inaugural NCAA Tournament. In 2013, Men's Volleyball qualified for a second Division III Tournament. After a four-year absence, the Slugs returned to the NCAA Tournament in 2019 and were national runners-up.

The Women's volleyball team has made three appearances in the NCAA tournament: 2013, 2015 and 2022. Both teams started playing at Kaiser Permanente Arena in 2018.

Water Polo
In the 2006 season, the men's water polo team won the Division III championship, as well as an overall NCAA ranking of 19th in the nation. However, both the men and women's water polo teams went to club status in 2008 due to budget constraints.

Club sports 
In addition to its NCAA sports, UCSC maintains a number of successful club sides including its women's rugby NCAA Division team, which won the Division II National Collegiate Championship during its 2005 season and has competed at nationals several times since, most recently in 2010 and 2013.  UCSC ultimate frisbee has a distinguished history, winning the men's collegiate national championship in 1991 and the women's national collegiate championship in 1994 and 1995. Many other club teams exist such as soccer, lacrosse, baseball, rugby, softball, and muggle quidditch.

Intramural athletics 
Although UCSC never had a track, the residential colleges regularly competed in an improvised "Slug Run" every spring from 1967 to 1982, though the Run now is a community event and fundraiser event hosted by the cross-country club for much needed fund to pay for entry fees, hotel, and transportation to race.

Approximately 25% of the student population participates in intramural athletics, which tend to be better funded than the intercollegiate athletic programs.

Championships

Appearances 
The UC Santa Cruz Banana Slugs have competed in the NCAA Tournament across 12 active sports (6 men's and 6 women's) a combined 111 times at the Division III level.

 Women's basketball (2): 2016, 2017
 Men's cross country (3): 2017, 2019, 2022
 Women's cross country (1): 2022
 Women's golf (1): 2007
 Men's soccer (8): 2000, 2001, 2003, 2004, 2005, 2006, 2007, 2009
 Women's soccer (12): 1999, 2000, 2002, 2006, 2007, 2008, 2009, 2011, 2015, 2016, 2017, 2019
 Men's swimming and diving (18): 1991, 1993, 1994, 1995, 1996, 1997, 1998, 1999, 2000, 2001, 2002, 2003, 2006, 2007, 2008, 2009, 2010, 2017
 Women's swimming and diving (16): 1989, 1993, 1995, 1996, 1997, 1998, 1999, 2000, 2001, 2002, 2003, 2004, 2005, 2006, 2007, 2008
 Men's tennis (33): 1983, 1984, 1987, 1988, 1989, 1990, 1991, 1992, 1993, 1994, 1995, 1996, 1997, 1998, 1999, 2000, 2001, 2002, 2003, 2004, 2005, 2006, 2007, 2008, 2009, 2010, 2011, 2012, 2013, 2014, 2015, 2016, 2018
 Women's tennis (10): 1994, 2002, 2005, 2006, 2007, 2008, 2012, 2013, 2014, 2016
 Men's volleyball (4): 2012, 2013, 2015, 2019
 Women's volleyball (3): 2013, 2015, 2022

Team 

The Banana Slugs of UC Santa Cruz earned 7 NCAA team championships at the Division III level.

 Men's (7)
 Tennis (7): 1989, 1995, 1996, 1998, 2005, 2007, 2009

Results

Below are nine national club team championships:

 Women's rugby – Division II (1): 2006 (USA Rugby)
 Co-ed sailing (1): 1976 (ICSA)
 Men's tennis – Division III (3): 2001, 2007, 2010 (ITA)
 Men's ultimate (1): 1991 (USA Ultimate)
 Women's ultimate (2): 1994, 1995 (USA Ultimate)
 Women's Water Polo – Division III (1): 2022 (Collegiate Water Polo Association)

Note: Those with no denoted division is assumed that the institution earned a national championship at the highest level.

Individual 

UC Santa Cruz had 18 Banana Slugs win NCAA individual championships at the Division III level.

Mascot 

UCSC's mascot is the banana slug (specifically, Ariolimax dolichophallus).
In 1970, volleyball team member David Van Cleve created the mascot "Banana Slugs" for the UCSC volleyball team.  He was concerned that, as sports began to gain in popularity at the institution, a team name or mascot did not exist. His roommate, Bob Grindeslug (no relation), silk-screened uniform shirts for the entire volleyball team in preparation for the All-Cal tournament that year. After their graduation in 1972, the team name was no longer used until 1974, when the UCSC club soccer team reinvigorated the Banana Slug mascot. Three soccer team members, Larry DeGhetaldi, Fred Bicknell, Sven Steinmo and their roommate, Richard Hedges, chose to name the team the Banana Slugs before an All-Cal tournament. The team's unusual name was noted by the San Jose Mercury News after the team suffered a humiliating defeat against the San Jose State Spartans. 

In the Fall of 1972, when the club basketball team became formalized (with a coach and expanded schedule), the athletic director at the time, Terry Warner, informed the team that they needed to have a mascot and that it had been chosen to be the Sea Lions.  The team summarily rejected that name, claiming to not need any mascot. Consequently, their uniforms simply said "UCSC" on them and there was no recognized mascot.  In 1980, when the university began more formally participating in NCAA intercollegiate sports, the then-chancellor and some student athletes declared the mascot to be the sea lions. Most students disliked the new mascot and offered an alternative mascot, the banana slug. In 1986, students voted via referendum to declare the banana slug the official mascot of UCSC – a vote the chancellor refused to honor, arguing that only athletes should choose the mascot. When a poll of athletes showed that they, too, wanted to be Slugs, the chancellor relented.

A chemistry major UC Berkeley transfer student to UCSC asked student activities for some service projects for Porter College.  She was made the first Porter College mural committee chairperson and was asked to represent Porter College to the Mascot Committee at the time.  She had a good background in student government and had some experience as an amateur Parliamentarian.  A few mascot meetings were held, perhaps without quorum, and the Porter College representative was lobbied by the athletes and the science professors.  

On the way to the important (final) Mascot Committee meeting, she stepped on an extremely flatulent banana slug, and so it was decided in that moment to push for the Banana Slug.  Knowing quorum was important, with one member allowed from each College, on the way to the meeting she found a Kresge student to be the Kresge representative. The leader of the committee was against the idea of the Banana Slug and taken aback to see the Porter College representative suddenly appearing to take control.  He tried to say no quorum, so no decision, but a count was forced, and quorum was established.  The Porter College representative had already gotten the Kresge representative to go along and second any motions she was going to make.  She moved to make the Banana Slug the mascot, and was seconded immediately.  The committee leader protested. Then, she quickly motioned to ratify by referendum (moved to a vote by the student body), and was immediately seconded, so moved.  She then essentially organized and ran the vote, as she had been trained to do in her earlier days participating in student government.  She knew that students would need their student body card to vote and so she rallied several classes to bring their cards and to vote.

The day of the vote, she rallied for students to go to the voting table.  It was a surprise to administration that so many students showed up with their student body cards and voted. There were some irritated faculty (including the chancellor) that made their opinions known as the voting was being set up, so the Porter College representative decided to stay anonymous when she was called to do the People Magazine interview.  She was told by the chancellor that the election didn't matter and the sea lion would be the mascot.  Eventually, the sea lion statue was removed from where it had been placed.

The June 16, 1986, issue of People magazine featured a full-page spread dedicated to the selection of the Banana Slug as the official mascot of UCSC. In February 2008, ESPN Sports Travel named the UCSC Banana Slugs as one of the ten best nicknames in college basketball.

The "Fiat Slug" logo prominently featured on campus is a trademark of UCSC owned by the Regents. It was developed by Bernt Wahl and two other students during the mascot controversy, who later incorporated as "Oxford West" and licensed their design from the Regents to produce clothing inspired by the university. The slug also is featured along with the school's logo on Vincent Vega's T-shirt in the 1994 film Pulp Fiction.

A sea lion statue can still be seen in front of the Thimann Hall lecture building.

2016 referendum 
By 2016 the athletic program had been operating at a deficit for many years, with its most recent expanding rising to $2 million per year even though its budget had remained at $1.4 million. Even so UCSC had the lowest operating budget in the NCAA Division III league. With few exceptions, most Banana Slugs teams had consistently very low attendance at their matches. At the same time the university was undergoing budget cuts that required a proportionate decrease in operating costs. Because of apparent lack of student support for college athletics, it was decided that it would be reasonable to channel the funds to other areas. UC Santa Cruz Provost Allison Galloway stated that under the current circumstances the university had to decide whether to keep funding the athletic program or to be able to maintain student services for an increasing student population.

The administration saw that the only available option to maintain the athletic program was to significantly increase the student athletic funding tuition fee from $5 per quarter to $90 per quarter, which would total to $270 for the academic year. In comparison, UC Berkeley fee totaled to $110 per year, UC San Diego fee was $268, and UC Davis fee was $150. Both UC Berkeley and UC Davis were NCAA Division I programs and while UC San Diego was not D-I but D-II its spending budget was $9 million, more than 6 times UCSC's. UCSC's increase of the fee to $270 would only raise the budget to $2 million. An online poll was scheduled for the end of May, where students would be asked if they were willing to approve the increase. Due to opposition to the proposal by the university's athletes and coaches as well as alumni, it was considered to be very unlikely that such a significant increase would pass. On May 24, 2016, it was announced that a record 43% of undergraduates participated in the referendum with 63% approving the significant fee increase in concept. The measure did not actually create the new fee, however, but instead tested the support that students would have for a potential fee.  The actual referendum to create the new fee waited a year, until 2017.

2017 referendum 
In May 2017, students approved Measure 68, the Intercollegiate Athletics and Athletics Activities Access Fee, a new fee of $38.50 per student per quarter. The measure is expected to provide athletics with $1.5 million per year.  39.23% of the student body cast votes, and 79.84% of votes were in favor of the new fee.  The fee expires in Spring 2042.

References

External links